is a place in the city of Sasebo in Nagasaki Prefecture, Japan. It is near Arita.  Mikawachi is the home of the blue and white Mikawachi ware.

 on the Sasebo Line serves the area.

Geography of Nagasaki Prefecture